Transversotrematidae is a family of trematodes in the order Plagiorchiida. It is the only family in the superfamily Transversotrematoidea, which is the only superfmaily in the suborder Transversotremata. It has been synonymised with Circuitiocoeliidae Wang, 1981, Squamacolidae Pan & Wang, 1985, and Transversotrematinae Witenberg, 1944.

Genera
 Circuitiocoelium Wang, 1981
 Crusziella Cribb, Bray & Barker, 1992
 Prototransversotrema Angel, 1969
 Transversotrema Witenberg, 1944

References

Plagiorchiida
Trematode families